The Women's Basketball tournament at the 2019 Military World Games was held in Wuhan, China from 19 to 26 October.

Preliminary round

Final Round

Bronze medal match

Gold medal match

Final standing

External links

Basketball Women
2019 women